Gedong Kirtya library was founded in 1928 by the Dutch in what was then their colonial capital of the Lesser Sunda Islands, Singaraja, and named for the Sanskrit word 'to try'. It is in the complex of Sasana Budaya, the old palace of the Buleleng Kingdom.

In its collection are lontar manuscripts (written on dried leaves of the rontal palm), prasasti (inscribed on copper plates) and manuscripts on paper in Balinese and Roman characters including documents from the colonial period (1901-1953).

Ex Bupati of Buleleng Dr Ketut Wirata Sindhu is upgrading the library into a full museum. When completed, the museum will cover the entire Sasana Budaya complex.

References 

 Bali, Lonely Planet(2003)

Libraries in Indonesia
Balinese culture
Buildings and structures in Bali
Organizations based in Bali